The Balta Dascălului is a left tributary of the river Olteț in Romania. It flows into the Olteț near Cioroiu, close to the confluence of Olteț and Olt.

References

Rivers of Romania
Rivers of Olt County